The Botswana Police College is located in Otse in the South East District. An ultra-modern new college campus for meeting the training needs of the Botswana Police Service was designed by FMA Architects Ltd (Canadian Architect - Samuel Oboh - was a resident Architect on this project), constructed by Stocks Building Africa and completed in 2000 at a cost of 230 million Pula.

The police college shares its campus with the International Law Enforcement Academies' Gaborone academy, known as ILEA Gaborone.  It is here where law enforcement officers from more than 25 countries across Africa come to learn the latest in law enforcement techniques.

See also
Botswana Police Service

External links
 ILEA Gaborone

Law enforcement in Botswana
Buildings and structures in Botswana